Dirk Wayenberg (14 September 1955 – 15 March 2007) was a Belgian racing cyclist. He finished in last place in the 1988 Tour de France.

References

External links

1955 births
2007 deaths
Belgian male cyclists
People from Geraardsbergen
Cyclists from East Flanders